Hopkins County is the name of two counties in the United States:

 Hopkins County, Kentucky 
 Hopkins County, Texas